The United States competed at the 1936 Summer Olympics in Berlin, Germany. The Americans finished second in the medal table behind the hosts. 359 competitors, 313 men and 46 women, took part in 127 events in 21 sports.

Medalists

Athletics
 Archie Williams- Won 1 gold medal in the 400m race.
Jesse Owens- Won 4 gold medals in the 100m race, the 200m race, the long jump, and the 4 × 100 m relay team.
John Woodruff- Won 1 gold medals in the 800m race.
Mack Robinson- Won 1 silver medal in the 200m race.
Ralph Metcalfe- Won 1 gold medal in the 4 × 100 m relay team and 1 silver medal in the 100m race.
James LuValle- Won 1 bronze medal in the 400m race.
Glenn Cunningham- Won 1 silver medal in the 1500m race.
Forrest Towns- Won 1 gold medal in the 110m hurdles.
Fritz Pollard- Won 1 bronze medal in the 110m hurdles.
Glenn Hardin- Won 1 gold medal in the 400m hurdles.
Foy Draper- Won 1 gold medal in the 4 × 100 m relay.
Frank Wykoff- Won 1 gold medal in the 4 × 100 m relay.
Eddie O'Brien- Won 1 silver medal in the 4 × 400 m relay.
Harold Cagle- Won 1 silver medal in the 4 × 400 m relay.
Robert Young- Won 1 silver medal in the 4 × 400 m relay.
Alfred Fitch- Won 1 silver medal in the 4 × 400 m relay.
Cornelius Johnson- Won 1 gold medal in the high jump.
Dave Albritton- Won 1 silver medal in the high jump.
Delos Thurber- Won 1 bronze medal in the high jump.
Earle Meadows- Won 1 gold medal in the pole vault.
Ken Carpenter- Won 1 gold medal in the discus.
Gordon Dunn- Won 1 silver medal in the discus.
Glenn Morris- Won 1 gold medal in the decathlon.
Bob Clark- Won 1 silver medal in the decathlon.
Jack Parker - Won 1 bronze medal in the decathlon.

Basketball
The men's basketball team won the gold medal. The players were as following.
Sam Balter
Ralph Bishop
Joe Fortenberry
Tex Gibbons
Francis Johnson
Carl Knowles
Frank Lubin
Art Mollner
Donald Piper
Jack Ragland
Willard Schmidt
Carl Shy
Duane Swanson
Bill Wheatley

Boxing
Jack Wilson- Won 1 silver medal in the Bantamweight.
Louis Daniel Lauria- Won 1 bronze medal in the Flyweight.

Canoeing
Ernest Riedel- Won 1 bronze medal in K1 10000 metres.

Football (soccer)
Results
 U.S. 0-1 Italy

Roster
 Charles Altemose
 Frank Bartkus
 Edward Begley
 Julius Chmielewski
 James Crockett
 William Fiedler
 Andrew Gajda
 Frank Greinert
 Fred Lutkefedder
 George Nemchik
 Peter Pietras
 Francis Ryan
 Fred Zbikowski
 Fritz Stoll
 Rob Denton

Rowing
The men's eight-man team won the gold medal.  The team consisted of the following:
Herbert Morris
Charles Day
Gordon Adam
John White
James McMillin
George Hunt
Joe Rantz
Don Hume
Robert Moch

Women Competitors

Athletics
Helen Stephens- Won 2 gold medals in the 100m race  and the 4 × 100 m relay.
Harriet Bland- Won 1 gold medal in the 4 × 100 m relay.
Betty Robinson- Won 1 gold medal in the 4 × 100 m relay.
Annette Rogers- Won 1 gold medal in the 4 × 100 m relay.

Swimming

Eleanor Holm was the favorite for the 100m backstroke, but she was suspended by Avery Brundage over “a drinking episode”. She had swum in the 1928 and 1932 Olympics, winning gold in 1932. Brundage was one of the most controversial figures in the US Olympic history, known for his racist and sexist remarks and actions and also for appeasing dictatorships, such as Nazi Germany and the Soviet Union.

Athletics

Louis Zamperini - long-distance runner competing on the 5000-meter event
Don Lash - long-distance runner competing on the 5000-meter and 10,000-meter events
Ellison Brown - Marathon runner

Basketball

Boxing

Canoeing

Cycling

Six cyclists represented the United States in 1936.

Individual road race
 Albert Byrd
 Charles Morton
 Paul Nixon
 John Sinibaldi

Team road race
 Albert Byrd
 Charles Morton
 Paul Nixon
 John Sinibaldi

Sprint
 Al Sellinger

Time trial
 Al Sellinger

Tandem
 William Logan
 Al Sellinger

Team pursuit
 Albert Byrd
 William Logan
 Charles Morton
 John Sinibaldi

Diving

Equestrian

Fencing

22 fencers represented the United States in 1936.

Men's foil
 Joe Levis
 Hugh Alessandroni
 Bill Pecora

Men's team foil
 Joe Levis, Hugh Alessandroni, John Potter, John Hurd, Warren Dow, Bill Pecora

Men's épée
 Frederick Weber
 Gustave Heiss
 Frank Righeimer

Men's team épée
 Frank Righeimer, Thomas Sands, Tracy Jaeckel, Gustave Heiss, José Raoul de Capriles, Andrew Boyd

Men's sabre
 John Huffman
 Peter Bruder
 Norman Cohn-Armitage

Men's team sabre
 Peter Bruder, Miguel de Capriles, Bela De Nagy, John Huffman, Samuel Stewart, Norman Cohn-Armitage

Women's foil
 Marion Lloyd
 Dorothy Locke
 Joanna de Tuscan

Football

Gymnastics

16 gymnasts, 8 men and 8 women, represented the United States in 1936.

Men's team
 Frank Cumiskey
 Kenny Griffin
 Frank Haubold
 Al Jochim
 Fred Meyer
 Chet Phillips
 Artie Pitt
 George Wheeler

Women's team
 Jennie Caputo
 Connie Caruccio-Lenz
 Margaret Duff
 Irma Haubold
 Marie Kibler
 Ada Lunardoni
 Adelaide Meyer
 Mary Wright

Handball

Hockey

Modern pentathlon

Three pentathletes represented the United States in 1936.

 Charles Leonard
 Alfred Starbird
 Frederick Weber

Rowing

The United States had 26 rowers participate in all seven rowing events in 1936.

 Men's single sculls
 Dan Barrow

 Men's double sculls
 John Houser
 Bill Dugan

 Men's coxless pair
 Harry Sharkey
 George Dahm

 Men's coxed pair
 Tom Curran
 Joe Dougherty
 George Loveless (cox)

 Men's coxless four
 James Thomson
 Eugene Fruehauf
 George Hague
 Alfred Sapecky

 Men's coxed four
 William Haskins
 Roger W. Cutler Jr.
 Paul Austin
 Robert B. Cutler
 Edward Bennett (cox)

 Men's eight
 Herbert Morris
 Charles Day
 Gordon Adam
 John White
 James McMillin
 George Hunt
 Joe Rantz
 Don Hume
 Robert Moch (cox)

Sailing

Shooting

Six shooters represented the United States in 1936.

25 m rapid fire pistol
 Ingals Fisher
 Morris Doob
 Dean Hudnutt

50 m pistol
 Elliott Jones
 William Riedell
 Ralph Marshall

Swimming

Water polo

Weightlifting

Wrestling

Art competitions

References

Nations at the 1936 Summer Olympics
1936
Oly